4th TFCA Awards 
December 17, 2000

Best Film: 
 Crouching Tiger,Hidden Dragon 
The 4th Toronto Film Critics Association Awards, honoring the best in film for 2000, were held on 17 December 2000.

Winners
Best Actor: 
Benicio del Toro – Traffic 
Runner-Up: Mark Ruffalo – You Can Count on Me

Best Actress: 
Laura Linney – You Can Count on Me
Runner-Up: Michelle Yeoh – Crouching Tiger, Hidden Dragon

Best Canadian Film: 
waydowntown
Runner-Up: Maelström

Best Director: 
Steven Soderbergh – Traffic
Runner-Up: Ang Lee – Crouching Tiger, Hidden Dragon

Best Film: 
Crouching Tiger, Hidden Dragon
Runner-Up: Traffic

Best Screenplay: 
You Can Count on Me – Kenneth Lonergan
Runner-Up: After Life – Hirokazu Koreeda

Best Supporting Actor (tie): 
Tobey Maguire – Wonder Boys
Jeffrey Wright – Shaft
Best Supporting Actress:
Zhang Ziyi – Crouching Tiger, Hidden Dragon
Runner-Up: Ellen Burstyn – Requiem for a Dream

References

2000
2000 film awards
2000 in Toronto
2000 in Canadian cinema